Edmund Viesturs (born June 22, 1959) is a high-altitude mountaineer, corporate speaker, and well known author in the mountain climbing community. He is the only American to have climbed all 14 of the world's eight-thousander mountain peaks, and only the fifth person to do so without using supplemental oxygen.  Along with Apa Sherpa, he has summitted peaks of over 8,000 meters on 21 occasions, including Mount Everest seven times.

Viesturs took part in the 1996 IMAX filming of Everest shortly after the 1996 Mount Everest disaster, which became the highest grossing documentary up to that time. Thirteen days after the disaster, his team summited Everest accompanied by a film crew. He also had a cameo in the year 2000 Hollywood blockbuster Vertical Limit.  Clive Standen plays Viesturs in the 2015 remake of Everest telling of the 1996 Mount Everest disaster.

Early life
Viesturs was born in Fort Wayne, Indiana, of Latvian and German descent. He was raised in Rockford, Illinois, Viesturs moved to Seattle, Washington in 1977 to attend the University of Washington. It was here that he began his mountaineering career on the slopes of Mount Rainier. Viesturs graduated from the University of Washington in 1981 with a BS in zoology and worked as a guide for Rainier Mountaineering. He later obtained a Doctor of Veterinary Medicine degree from Washington State University.

Climbing career
His interest in the Himalayas was sparked in high school by reading Maurice Herzog's account of the first climb of Annapurna, titled Annapurna. After climbing Kangchenjunga in 1989, Mount Everest in 1990 and K2 in 1992, Viesturs became an international mountain guide and was sponsored for full-time mountaineering. He served as a guide for Rob Hall's Adventure Consultants company during their 1995 Everest expedition.  Viesturs climbs with Finnish partner Veikka Gustafsson.

In 1992, he and fellow American Scott Fischer brought down French climber Chantal Mauduit, suffering from exhaustion, after her summit of K2.  Viesturs was in the IMAX climbing team during the 1996 Everest Disaster. He was featured in David Breashears' documentary film Everest (1998), and filming was delayed as a blizzard struck. The IMAX team postponed shooting and followed Viesturs up the mountain to aid the stranded climbers. The team ultimately decided to keep going, and summitted Everest on May 23, 1996.  Viesturs was also featured in the  Nova television documentary, Everest: The Death Zone (1998), in which he and Breashears climbed Everest to the summit, while undergoing physical and mental tests to record the effects of altitude on humans.

In July 2003, Viesturs and a Kazakh team, headed by Denis Urubko, were instrumental in the rescue of French climber Jean-Christophe Lafaille from Broad Peak.  Lafaille had developed high-altitude pulmonary edema and was unable to complete his descent.  They coordinated a rescue attempt in the dark, and were able to get Lafaille safely off the mountain and helicoptered out for medical help.

In 2005, Viesturs became the first American, and 12th climber in history, to summit all 14 mountains over 8,000 meters (collectively known as the eight-thousanders). He is the 5th climber in history to do it without the use of supplemental oxygen.  Viesturs has summitted Mount Everest seven times. Research published in 2022 estimated that Viesturs was one of only three climbers in history to have stood on the "true" geographical summit of all the eight-thousanders and that Viesturs was the first to do so.

Viesturs' more recent climbs have included Broad Peak (the world's 12th highest mountain) and Nanga Parbat (the world's ninth highest mountain) in 2003, Annapurna (the world's 10th highest mountain) in 2005, and Mount Everest (for the seventh time) in 2009.  On July 8, 2009 he led an expedition to Mount Rainier as part of the United Way Climb for the Community effort. UCLA coach Jim Mora, Seahawks CEO Tod Leiweke, and NFL commissioner Roger Goodell took part in this charitable enterprise, summiting the 14,410 ft peak.  Viesturs led an expedition to Antarctica, in January 2011, to climb its highest peak, Vinson Massif.  In May 2021, he summitted Mount Rainier for the 216th time.  Viesturs now acts as a guide for RMI Expeditions.

Other work
Viesturs was a cinematographer for the  film Trio for One (2003), which told the story of French alpinist Jean-Christophe Lafaille's mission to climb Dhaulagiri, Nanga Parbat, and Broad Peak in a period of two months.  He acts as a design consultant for manufacturers of outdoor equipment, and is a representative of his adopted hometown's football team, the Seattle Seahawks.  He is a member of the board of directors for Big City Mountaineers, an urban youth organization that offers wilderness experiences.  Viesturs has also found a niche as a corporate motivational speaker.

Awards
Viesturs is a recipient of the David A. Sowles Memorial Award (1992)  from the American Alpine Club.  He is also the recipient of the Explorers Club Lowell Thomas Award (2001)  He was named National Geographic's Adventurer of the Year (2005).

Media

Books
 Peter Potterfield wrote Himalayan Quest: Ed Viesturs on the 8,000-Meter Giants (February 2003), chronicling Viesturs' climbing career to that point. Viesturs contributed photographs for the book and David Breashears wrote the introduction.
 Viesturs has published his autobiography, No Shortcuts to the Top: Climbing the World's 14 Highest Peaks (October 2006), documenting his 16-year journey summitting all 14 eight-thousanders, and his strategies to manage risk in extreme mountain environments.
 Viesturs and David Roberts published the book K2: Life and Death on the World's Most Dangerous Mountain, (October 2009) which tells the story of six expeditions to the world's second tallest mountain.
 Viesturs published The Will to Climb: Obsession and Commitment and the Quest to Climb Annapurna--the World's Deadliest Peak (October 2011), which he describes his own experiences on Annapurna as well as those of others who have attempted to climb the most dangerous (statistically) 8000 meter peak.
 Viesturs and David Roberts published The Mountain: Epic Adventures on Everest (October 8, 2013), which both surveys Viesturs' personal ascents and recounts other historical ascents of Mount Everest.

Films
 He was a featured climber in David Breashears' Everest IMAX film in 1998.
 He made a cameo appearance as himself in the film Vertical Limit (2000).
 He was portrayed by Clive Standen in the 2015 adventure film Everest.

Games
 Viesturs featured in a.k.a. studios' Everest (1999) published by GT Interactive.
 Viesturs and some of his footage of Mount Everest are featured in Big Fish Games' game Hidden Expedition: Everest (2007). It achieved first runner-up for Best Hidden Object Game of 2007.

Periodicals
 He was featured on the cover of Outside Magazine'''s 30th anniversary issue in 2007.

Television
 He was a guest on The Daily Show on December 7, 2006.
 He was a guest on Charlie Rose on January 16, 2007.
 He appeared on The Colbert Report on March 14, 2007, where he agreed to plant a Colbert Report'' flag atop Mount Everest the next time he went; on July 2, 2009, he brought the Colbert Nation flag back from Everest's summit to the show.

See also
 List of Mount Everest summiters by number of times to the summit
 List of 20th-century summiters of Mount Everest

References

External links
 
 Ed Viesturs official website
 
 
 
 Ed Viesturs at Greatoutdoors.com

1959 births
Living people
American mountain climbers
American people of Latvian descent
American people of German descent
People from Rockford, Illinois
University of Washington alumni
Washington State University alumni
American summiters of Mount Everest
Summiters of all 14 eight-thousanders
Summiters of K2